Broaddus High School is a public secondary school located in the town of Broaddus, Texas, USA and classified as a 2A school by the UIL.  It is a part of the Broaddus Independent School District located in southwestern San Augustine County.   In 2015, the school was rated "Met Standard" by the Texas Education Agency.

Athletics
The Broaddus Bulldogs compete in these sports - 

Cross Country, Basketball, Golf, Tennis, Track, Baseball & Softball

State Titles
Boys Basketball 
1976(1A), 1977(1A)

References

External links
Broaddus ISD website

Public high schools in Texas
Schools in San Augustine County, Texas